At the 1990 Commonwealth Games, the athletics events were held at the Mount Smart Stadium in Auckland, New Zealand from 27 January to 3 February 1990. A total of 42 events were contested, 23 by male and 19 by female athletes.

Medal summary

Men

Women

Medal table

Participation

References
Commonwealth Games Medallists - Men. GBR Athletics. Retrieved on 2010-07-21.
Commonwealth Games Medallists - Women. GBR Athletics. Retrieved on 2010-07-21.

 
1990 Commonwealth Games events
1990
Commonwealth Games
1990 Commonwealth Games